Klaus von See (10 August 1927 – 30 August 2013) was a German philologist who specialized in Germanic studies.

Biography
Klaus von See was born in the village of Altendorf, Brome, Germany on 10 August 1927. He studied history, German and Scandinavian philology at the University of Hamburg, receiving his doctorate there under the supervision of historian Hermann Aubin in 1953. After completing his legal studies, von See became greatly interested in Germanic and Scandinavian philology, and in 1957 he took up a position as an assistant at the Germanic Seminar the University of Hamburg. 

von See habilitated at the University of Kiel in 1962 with the thesis Altnordische Rechtswörter. Philologische Studien zur Rechtsauffassung und Rechtsgesinnung der Germanen, which examined terminology in early Germanic law, particularly Medieval Scandinavian law. His thesis was supervised by Hans Kuhn. The same year, von See was appointed Professor of Germanic Philology at the Goethe University Frankfurt. Here von See expanded the Nordic Department of the German Seminar, and 1976 he created an Institute for Scandinavian Studies under his leadership. 

von See specialized in the study of Old Norse literature. He was the author of several works on Old Norse literature and Germanic studies. von See was a recipient of the Knight's Cross of the Order of the Falcon, a Knight of the Order of the Dannebrog, and an Honorary Life Member of the Viking Society for Northern Research.

von See retired from the Goethe University Frankfurt in 1995. He died in Frankfurt on 30 August 2013.

Selected works
 Altnordische Rechtswörter. Philologische Studien zur Rechtsauffassung und Rechtsgesinnung der Germanen (Hermaea/N.F.; Bd. 16). Niemeyer, Tübingen 1962 (Habilitationsschrift).
 Germanische Verskunst (Sammlung Metzler). Metzler, Stuttgart 1967.
 Deutsche Germanen-Ideologie. Vom Humanismus bis zur Gegenwart. Athenäum-Verlag, Frankfurt/M. 1970.
 Germanische Heldensage. Stoffe, Probleme, Methoden; eine Einführung. 2. Auflage. VG Athenaion, Wiesbaden 1981,  (EA Wiesbaden 1971).
 Barbar, Germane, Arier. Die Suche nach der Identität der Deutschen. Winter, Heidelberg 1994, .
 Kommentar zu den Liedern der Edda. Winter, Heidelberg 1997–2019 (7 Bde., zusammen mit Beatrice La Farge, Katja Schulz u. a.).
 Europa und der Norden im Mittelalter. Winter, Heidelberg 1999, .
 Die Göttinger Sieben. Kritik einer Legende (Beiträge zur neueren Literaturgeschichte/3; Bd. 155). 3. Auflage. Winter, Heidelberg 2000,  (EA Heidelberg 1997).
 Freiheit und Gemeinschaft. Völkisch-nationales Denken in Deutschland zwischen Französischer Revolution und Erstem Weltkrieg. Winter, Heidelberg 2001, .
 Königtum und Staat im skandinavischen Mittelalter. Winter, Heidelberg 2002,  (zugl. Dissertation, Universität Hamburg).
 Texte und Thesen. Streitfragen der deutschen und skandinavischen Geschichte. Winter, Heidelberg 2003,  (mit einem Vorwort von Julia Zernack).
 Ideologie und Philologie. Aufsätze zur Kultur- und Wissenschaftsgeschichte (Frankfurter Beiträge zur Germanistik; Bd. 44). Winter, Heidelberg 2006, .

Sources

 Gerd Wolfgang Weber (Hrsg.): Idee, Gestalt, Geschichte. Studien zur europäischen Kulturtradition. Festschrift Klaus von See. University Press, Odense 1988,  (mit einem Vorwort Zu Werk und Wissenschaft des Germanisten Klaus von See und einer Bibliographie Klaus von Sees bis 1988 S. 713–719).
 Bibliographie Klaus von Sees von 1989 bis 2002. In: Texte und Thesen. Streitfragen der deutschen und skandinavischen Geschichte. Winter, Heidelberg 2003, S. 305–309.
 Kürschners Deutscher Gelehrten-Kalender 2009. 22. Ausgabe. K. G. Saur Verlag, München 2009, .
 Notker Hammerstein: Die Johann Wolfgang Goethe Universität Frankfurt am Main, Bd. 2: Nachkriegszeit und Bundesrepublik 1945–1972. Wallstein-Verlag, Göttingen 2012, S. 567–570.
 Julia Zernack: Klaus von See 1927–2013. In: European Journal of Scandinavian Studies 44, 1 (2014), S. 1–3.

1927 births
2013 deaths
German philologists
Germanic studies scholars
Academic staff of Goethe University Frankfurt
Knights of the Order of the Dannebrog
Knights of the Order of the Falcon
Old Norse studies scholars
People from Gifhorn (district)
University of Hamburg alumni